The Battle of Resaca de la Palma was one of the early engagements of the Mexican–American War, where the United States Army under General Zachary Taylor engaged the retreating forces of the Mexican Ejército del Norte ("Army of the North") under General Mariano Arista on May 9, 1846. The United States emerged victorious and forced the Mexicans out of Texas.

Background

Following the Mexican defeat at the Battle of Palo Alto the previous day, Arista on the morning of May 9 moved his forces to a more defensible position along a resaca, known as Resaca de Guerrero to the Mexicans but as Resaca de la Palma to the Americans. Recalling his experiences at the Siege of Fort Texas, he positioned his forces along the twelve foot deep and two hundred foot wide resaca, three miles from the Rio Grande, by 10 a.m. Arista placed most of his infantry in the ravine, thickly forested on either side, to negate the effectiveness of Taylor's artillery, with the 6th and 10th Infantry, Sappers, 2nd Light Infantry and 1st Infantry being placed east of the road, and the 2nd Infantry, Tampico Battalion and 4th Infantry west of the road. Covering the flanks in the rear were the Presidiales, the light cavalry, and the 7th and 8th Regiments, and two artillery batteries on the south bank.

Taylor reached the area about 3 p.m. and ordered Captain William W. Mackall's skirmishers and Captain Randolph Ridgely's battery along the road, with the 4th and 5th Infantry to the left and the remaining 4th and 3rd Infantry on the right.

Battle
Fighting was disorganised and uncoordinated due to the dense chaparral and the intense Mexican artillery fire, although Ridgely did repulse a Mexican cavalry charge. Taylor ordered a charge by Captain Charles A. May's dragoon squadron with the objective of clearing the Mexican battery. May's exchange with Ridgeley supposedly included, "Hello Ridgely, where is that Battery? I am ordered to charge it." "Hold on Charley, 'till I draw their fire and you will see where they are." May's charge however carried them well past the Mexican artillery and although he managed to capture General Romulo Diaz de la Vega, he could not hold the guns. Taylor then ordered William G. Belknap's 5th and 8th Infantry to secure the guns, which they did. The Mexicans forces east of the road then retreated from their positions.

West of the road, Captain Robert C. Buchanan and members of the 4th Infantry, found a trail which turned towards the Mexican left flank, enabling them to take and hold the battery located there. They were able to defend the position from General Pedro de Ampudia's counterattacks, and the entire Mexican force panicked and fled across the Rio Grande, with many Mexican soldiers drowning in the attempt.

Aftermath
The Mexican Army left behind a number of artillery pieces, Arista's writing desk and silver service, the colors of Mexico's lauded Tampico Battalion, and other baggage. Among the several captured Mexican artillery pieces were two 8-pounder bronze guns, two 6-pounder bronze guns, and four 4-pounder bronze guns.

Taylor's army settled into their Fort Texas campsite as Taylor considered his next move, although he did exchange prisoners with Arista. Taylor crossed the Rio Grande on 18 May, Arista's army having abandoned their artillery, sick and wounded at Linares, Nuevo Leon during their retreat to Monterrey.

Before accepting a prisoner exchange with General Arista, Taylor was noted for his humane treatment of the abandoned Mexican wounded, giving them the same care as was given to the American wounded. After tending to the wounded he performed the last rites for the dead of both the American and Mexican soldiers killed during the battle.

The Resaca De La Palma Battlefield is in the city limits of present-day Brownsville, Texas, but is part of the Palo Alto Battlefield National Historical Park.

The Battle of Resaca de la Palma inspired the name of Resaca, Georgia, a community that later became the site of the Battle of Resaca.

Gallery

Further reading
 Grant, U.S. Personal Memoirs of U.S. Grant, Vol. I, pp 65–69, 
 '''Appendix To The Congressional Globe, 29th Cong...1st Session

See also
 Battles of the Mexican–American War
 1848 in Mexico
 List of conflicts in the United States
 Saint Patrick's Battalion

References

External links

 Resaca de la Palma Overview @ Palo Alto Battlefield National Historic Site NPS website
 Guns Along the Rio Grande: Palo Alto and Resaca de la Palma, CMH Pub 73-2, Center of Military History
 A Continent Divided: The U.S. - Mexico War, Center for Greater Southwestern Studies, the University of Texas at Arlington

1846 in Mexico
Battles of the Texas Ranger Division
History of Brownsville, Texas
Texas Campaign
Irish-American history and culture in Texas
Zachary Taylor
May 1846 events
1846 in the Mexican-American War